General National Archive is the name of several national archives in Latin America.

General Archive of the Nation (Argentina)
General Archive of the Nation (Colombia)
General National Archive (El Salvador)
General National Archive (Mexico)
General National Archive (Nicaragua)
General Archive of the Nation (Peru)
General National Archive (Uruguay)
General National Archive (Venezuela)